Costa Rica competed at the 2016 Summer Olympics in Rio de Janeiro, Brazil, from 5 to 21 August 2016. This was the nation's fifteenth appearance at the Summer Olympics, since its debut in 1936.

Costa Rican Olympic Committee selected a squad of 11 athletes, six men and five women, to compete in six different sports at the Games. This was approximately the same size as the previous Games, with the addition of two female athletes and the difference of two males. Among the sports represented by the athletes, Costa Rica marked its Olympic debut in beach volleyball.

Nearly half of the Costa Rican roster had competed in London 2012, with sprinter Nery Brenes leading the athletes as the most experienced member and the nation's flag bearer in the opening ceremony at his third Games.

For the fourth consecutive time, Costa Rica left Rio de Janeiro without a single Olympic medal. Unable to reach the final, Brenes was the only athlete to produce a best finish for the Costa Rican squad at the Games, placing sixth each in the semifinal heat of both the men's 200 and 400 metres.

Athletics (track and field)
 
Costa Rican athletes have so far achieved qualifying standards in the following athletics events (up to a maximum of 3 athletes in each event):

Track & road events

Field events

Cycling

Road
Costa Rica has qualified one rider in the men's Olympic road race by virtue of his top 5 national ranking in the 2015 UCI America Tour.

Mountain biking
Costa Rica has qualified one mountain biker for the men's Olympic cross-country race, by virtue of a top two national finish, not yet qualified, at the 2015 Pan American Championships.

Judo

Costa Rica has qualified one judoka for the men's lightweight category (73 kg) at the Games. Miguel Murillo earned a continental quota spot from the Pan American region as highest-ranked Costa Rican judoka outside of direct qualifying position in the IJF World Ranking List of 30 May 2016.

Swimming

Costa Rica has received a Universality invitation from FINA to send a female swimmer to the Olympics.

Triathlon
 
Costa Rica has entered one triathlete to compete at the Games. London 2012 Olympian Leonardo Chacón was ranked among the top 40 eligible triathletes in the men's event based on the ITU Olympic Qualification List as of 15 May 2016.

Volleyball

Beach
Costa Rica women's beach volleyball team qualified directly for the Olympics by winning the final match over Mexico at the 2016 NORCECA Continental Cup in Guaymas, Mexico, signifying the nation's Olympic debut in the sport.

See also
Costa Rica at the 2015 Pan American Games
Costa Rica at the 2016 Summer Paralympics

References

External links 

 

Nations at the 2016 Summer Olympics
2016
2016 in Costa Rican sport